The 2002 Major League Soccer All-Star Game was the 7th Major League Soccer All-Star Game, played on August 3, 2002 at RFK Stadium in Washington, D.C. Major League Soccer, looking to capitalize on the success of the United States at the 2002 FIFA World Cup, invited the U.S. national team to compete against the MLS All-Stars. Bruce Arena assembled a roster of the national team's most prominent domestic players in the last decade, while then-San Jose Earthquakes head coach Frank Yallop formed an All-Star team of the top talent among the league's remaining players.

The match

Summary 

Despite bad weather leading to a rain delay in the first half, the game saw a flurry of goals toward its conclusion. U.S. standout and San Jose Earthquakes' forward Landon Donovan opened the scoring for the national team, while the Dallas Burn's Jason Kreis responded with the equalizer in the following minute. 

D.C. United midfielder and MVP Marco Etcheverry gave the All-Stars the lead with help from fellow Bolivian Joselito Vaca. The Los Angeles Galaxy's Cobi Jones tied the game on a Brian McBride cross, but the New England Revolution's Steve Ralston scored late in the second half to give MLS the All-Star Game win.

Details 

|valign="top"|
|valign="top" width="50%"|

External links
 USATODAY.com - Game to showcase MLS', USA's strides
 MLS All-Star 2002 match report

MLS All-Star Game
All-Star Game
MLS All-Star
Sports competitions in Washington, D.C.
Soccer in Washington, D.C.
August 2002 sports events in the United States
United States men's national soccer team matches